Tom Hogan is currently a Operating Managing Director for Vista Equity Partners.  He currently serves on the board of Pluralsight, Infoblox, and Gainsight.  Prior to joining Vista in January 2021, Tom was the Chairman and CEO of Kony, Inc. from 2014 to its acquisition in the fall of 2019 by Swiss-based Temenos.  Hogan assisted with the integration and transition of Kony for three months and exited in February, 2020.  Prior to his Kony assignment, Hogan was the executive vice president of Sales and Marketing for HP's $57B Enterprise Business in 2010 after serving as the head of HP's Software business from 2006 - 2009.  He also served a twelve month assignment as executive vice president and general manager of CSC.
  
While EVP of HP's Software business, Hogan led several acquisitions including the acquisition of Mercury Interactive and Opsware.  Prior to HP, Tom Hogan served as president and CEO of Vignette and SVP of Sales at Siebel Systems. Hogan began his career at IBM in 1982.  He is currently a member of the Citrix board of directors.

Tom Hogan holds a master's degree from Northwestern’s Kellogg School of Management with distinction and a BS in biomedical engineering from the University of Illinois.

References
VentureBeat – Thomas E Hogan Appointed Chief Executive Officer of Kony – March 2014
CNET – HP taps Vignette CEO for software job – Jan 2006
HP Delivers Instant-on Enterprise – Nov 2010
Information Week – HP attacks Innovation Gridlock – May 2010
HP Announces Leadership Changes for HP Enterprise Sales, Marketing and Strategy – April 5, 2010
Forbes  –  Hewlett-Packard's Move Into Software  – June 2009
ZD net – HP's expanding software portfolio – Aug 2007
InfoWorld – InfoWorld NewsMakers: Hewlett-Packard's Tom Hogan  – Aug 2006
Business Wire – HP Opens HP Sales University – Dec  2010

1959 births
Living people
Businesspeople from Chicago
University of Illinois alumni
Hewlett-Packard people